Fubon Bank (Hong Kong) Limited ("Fubon Bank")  is a Hong Kong based bank that is a wholly owned subsidiary of Fubon Financial Holding Co. ("Fubon Financial Holdings"), one of the largest financial holding companies in Taiwan. 

Fubon Bank (Hong Kong) operates 17 branches, 3 SME Banking Services Centers and 1 Securities Services Centre in Hong Kong, providing a wide range of financial services encompassing consumer and wholesale banking, wealth management, financial markets, securities brokerage and investment services.  Fubon Bank holds an A-2 short-term, BBB+ long-term rating from Standard & Poor’s. The rating reflects Fubon Bank’s strong capitalization, good liquidity and sound asset quality.

History 
Sun Hung Kai Bank (Traditional Chinese: 新鴻基銀行), originally established as Sun Hung Kai Finance Company (the financing arm of Sun Hung Kai Securities).

The original Sun Hung Kai Bank shareholders included Banque Paribas, Merrill Lynch, and the family of Fung King Hey (founder of Sun Hung Kai Securities).

In 1985, Ahmet D. Arsan, Asia Head of Arab Banking Corporation (ABC), arranged for ABC to acquire 75% of Sun Hung Kai Bank, which, at the time, was suffering from sub-optimal results and was ripe for a take-over.  Arsan was an influential Turkish-American banker who ABC had recruited in 1982 to head ABC Asia Pacific, after his success, years earlier, in establishing the Asia Pacific arm of First Chicago (now JP Morgan Asia).  Immediately following the 1985 acquisition of Sun Hung Kai Bank by ABC, Arsan made sweeping changes in the bank, ranging from the executive management team and most of the bank's staff, to the bank's entire set of operating procedures, on which all employees were trained.  In 1986, Arsan changed the institution's name and re-branded the organization as International Bank of Asia (IBA); (港基國際銀行).  Ahmet D. Arsan was the founding Chief Executive Officer and Managing Director of International Bank of Asia (IBA) from 1985 to 1989, after which Arsan left IBA and established a private Hong Kong based trading firm.

In 1990, following Arsan's departure, ABC acquired the remaining 25% of IBA shares, making IBA a wholly owned subsidiary of ABC, until October 1993 when China Everbright Group became a 20% stake holder.  In November 1990, IBA was listed on the Hong Kong Stock Exchange.

In February 2004 Fubon Financial Holding Co., Ltd., a member of Taiwanese financial institution Fubon Group, in an acquisition of IBA shares from both ABC and China Everbright Group, acquired a 75% stake in IBA.  The M&A advisor was Citigroup Global Markets.

At the 2005 Fubon Group annual general meeting, the Fubon board approved for IBA to adopt the Fubon name.  On 6 April 2005, IBA was renamed Fubon Bank (Hong Kong) Limited.

Timeline 
1970: Founded by Mr. Fung King Hey, one of the founders of Sun Hung Kai & Co. Limited.
1979: Listed on the Hong Kong Stock Exchange.
1978: BNP Paribas became the shareholder of the bank.
1980: Merrill Lynch became the shareholder of the bank.
1983: Bank run happened in the bank after the burst of Hong Kong real estate bubble and the fear of Hong Kong handover from Britain to China.
1985: Arab Banking Corporation paid HK$359.72 million to acquire the bank from Fung.
1986: Renamed to International Bank of Asia (IBA).
2004: Fubon Financial Holding of Taiwan acquired IBA.
2005: International Bank of Asia was renamed to Fubon Bank (Hong Kong) Limited.

References

External links
Fubon Bank (Hong Kong) Limited
Fubon Financial Holding Co., Ltd.

Banks established in 2005
Banks of Hong Kong
Companies formerly listed on the Hong Kong Stock Exchange